Felice Bisleri (30 November 1851 – 17 September 1921) was an Italian businessman, inventor and chemist.

He was born in Verolanuova near Brescia and established the Felice Bisleri & Co. chemical laboratory in Milan, developing the successful "Ferro-China Bisleri", an amaro made drink as an alcohol infusion of cinchona bark, herbs and iron salts. The company also produced "Nocera Umbra" mineral water, named after Nocera Umbra, as well as the "Esanofele", a chemical based on quinine, iron and arsenic to combat malaria.

Bisleri died in San Pellegrino.  The Via Felice Bisleri in Milan is named after him. The Bisleri mineral water brand still exists, having been sold to India's Parle in the 1969.

Awards
Silver Medal of Military Valor for his fighting at the  Battle of Bezzecca (21 July 1866)

References

Scientists from Brescia
Italian pharmacists
Businesspeople from Brescia
Recipients of the Silver Medal of Military Valor
1851 births
1921 deaths